The Provisional & Acting Chief Justice of Sri Lanka is the temporary head of the judicial system of Sri Lanka as the chief judge of the Supreme Court of Sri Lanka. The Chief Justice is one of ten Supreme Court justices; the other nine are the Puisne Justices of the Supreme Court of Sri Lanka.

Provisional & acting chief justices

See also
 List of chief justices of Sri Lanka
 List of justices of the Supreme Court of Sri Lanka
 List of justices of the Supreme Court of Sri Lanka by court composition

References

External links
 Supreme Court of Sri Lanka

 
Government of Sri Lanka
Sri Lankan government officials
Chief Justices, Acting